Dana Cooper is an American singer-songwriter from Missouri. His awards include the 2014 Heritage Musician award from the Pilgrim Center for the Arts in Kansas City, MO and Folk Alliance International's 2015 Spirit of Folk award. He has performed on Austin City Limits, Mountain Stage and at the Kerrville Folk Festival. Cooper's songs have been recorded by a long list of artists that include Trout Fishing in America, Rex Foster, Claire Lynch, Maura O’Connell, Pierce Pettis, and Susan Werner. Fellow singer-songwriter Buzz Holland has said “Cooper is a person who can sing like an angel and play like the devil.”

Early music and career 
Dana Cooper was born in Kansas City, Missouri in 1951. From an early age, he expressed an interest in singing and playing drums, guitar, and harmonica. By thirteen he had begun writing his own songs and by sixteen he was regularly performing at the Vanguard Coffeehouse and Sign Coffeehouse in Kansas City. He was awarded several scholarships, but only attended college for a year before dropping out to focus on music.

Cooper moved to Los Angeles in the early 1970s to work on his debut solo album with Elektra Records. Dana Cooper was released in 1973, featuring Leland Sklar on bass and Russ Kunkel on drums. Around 1975, Cooper's longtime friend and fellow songwriter Shake Russell began to send letters to Cooper, encouraging him to move to Houston, Texas. In 1977, Cooper was finally convinced and moved to Texas, where he began writing, performing and recording with Russell. They formed the Shake Russell/Dana Cooper Band shortly after Cooper arrived. Their bandmates included Michael Mashkes on bass and guitar, Jim Alderman on drums and piano, and Pete Gorisch (and, later, Riley Osbourn) on keyboard. The group played gigs in the Houston club circuit like Anderson Fair, Steamboat Springs, and Rockefeller's. During its five-year run, the Shake Russell/Dana Cooper Band released three albums. The self-produced Songs on the Radio (1978) sold over 10,000 copies between Houston and Austin without the help of a major distributor. In 1980, the group appeared on Austin City Limits. The Shake Russell/Dana Cooper Band was released through Michael Brovsky's South Coast Records branch of MCA; the album took two years of work before it was released in 1981. In 1982, the Shake Russell/Dana Cooper Band worked with the Michael Marcoulier Band and John Vandiver to produce the Comin’ Home album on Twin Dream Records. The band separated shortly after, though members would continue to play together occasionally over the years.

Cooper went on to start his own power trio, DC3, a three-man indie rock-band. The group released the indie single “Give Us the Money” in 1983, an eponymous self-produced cassette in 1985, and the Perpetual Man cassette in 1986.[3] The band changed its name to the Nuclear Family in 1987 and released a self-titled album. In 1988, Cooper and his wife moved to Nashville, Tennessee, so that Cooper could focus on his solo career.

Later music and recordings 
Cooper released the solo CD Stone By Stone in 1992. Thrill of Love, a collaboration with Shake Russell and Jack Saunders, followed in 1994. Thrill of Love was named Album of the Year by the Houston Press/KLOL Music Awards. In 1995, Cooper released a live acoustic album, Roughly Speaking, which included a breadth of old and new material. His 1997 album Miracle Mile, produced by fellow Kansas City native Josh Leo, featured guest appearances by Lyle Lovett and Maura O'Connell. Miracle Mile was nominated for a Nashville Music Award as “Best Pop Album” and was chosen by Performing Songwriter Magazine as one of the top DIY recordings of the year. Harry Truman Built a Road was named one of the best records of 2002 by the Tennessean and was also chosen as one of the best DIY recordings for that year. Made of Mud, released on King Easy Records in 2005, won Cooper the “Best Male Songwriter” award by Indie Acoustic Project. In 2010 Cooper began working with guitarist/songwriter/producer Thomm Jutz. Together they have recorded four projects, The Conjurer in 2010, Road Show in 2012, Building a Human Being in 2015, and Incendiary Kid in 2017.

Cooper has become an integral figure in the Nashville songwriting community, collaborating with renowned writers like Tom Kimmel, Kim Carnes and Don Henry. Cooper has been invited to participate in songwriting workshops from Belfast to Copenhagen to Austin.

Discography

Solo work

Collaborations

References

External links 

 Dana Cooper Exhibit, Houston Folk Music Archive (Woodson Research Center, Rice University)
 Dana Cooper oral history (Woodson Research Center, Rice University)
 Dana Cooper Discography

Living people
Year of birth missing (living people)
Singer-songwriters from Missouri
American male singer-songwriters
People from Kansas City, Missouri
Musicians from Kansas City, Missouri
Musicians from Houston
Singer-songwriters from Texas